Onemile Creek is a stream in the U.S. state of Wisconsin. It is a tributary to Twomile Creek.

Onemile Creek was so named for its distance,  from the original Grand Rapids townsite.

References

Rivers of Wood County, Wisconsin
Rivers of Wisconsin